Kamana Koji (born 13 March 1967) is a Congolese long-distance runner. He competed in the men's marathon at the 1988 Summer Olympics.

References

External links
 

1967 births
Living people
Athletes (track and field) at the 1988 Summer Olympics
Democratic Republic of the Congo male long-distance runners
Democratic Republic of the Congo male marathon runners
Olympic athletes of the Democratic Republic of the Congo
Place of birth missing (living people)
21st-century Democratic Republic of the Congo people